Joel Craig Ehlo (born August 11, 1961) is a retired American basketball player. He played fifteen seasons in the National Basketball Association (NBA) with four teams, amassing career totals of 7,492 points, 2,456 assists and 3,139 rebounds.

Playing career
A  guard/forward from Odessa Junior College and Washington State University, and led the Cougars to the NCAA tournament in his senior season.  Ehlo was selected in the third round of the 1983 NBA draft by the Houston Rockets, and went with the Rockets to the 1986 NBA Finals in a losing cause to the Boston Celtics.

Ehlo spent the majority of his career with the Cleveland Cavaliers, and was originally signed when Mark Price went down with an injury. With Cleveland, he tallied 5,130 points, 2,285 assists, and 2,267 rebounds in seven seasons (1987–1993). Ehlo is perhaps best remembered for being the victim of one of Chicago Bulls star Michael Jordan's greatest performances. On May 7, 1989, Ehlo was defending Jordan when he made "The Shot", the series-clinching jumper in the first round of the NBA Playoffs in front of a Cleveland home crowd, then considered an upset as the Cavaliers were the third seed in the east and Chicago was the sixth. Ehlo's career high in points was 31, achieved three times: v. Michael Jordan, Dominique Wilkins, and Ron Harper.

Ehlo spent the second half of his career with the Atlanta Hawks as Steve Smith's backup. Before the 1996–97 season, he signed with the Seattle SuperSonics, but was used sparingly and did not play during the playoffs. He was waived by the SuperSonics in October that year before the start of the 1997–98 season.

Post retirement
Ehlo worked as an analyst on Gonzaga men's basketball games for five seasons, then became an assistant coach for Eastern Washington University in 2011. He coached at EWU for two years, until resigning on July 11, 2013. Later that year, Ehlo underwent drug treatment owing to an addiction to prescription painkillers following back surgery.

In July 2019, Ehlo was hired as a color analyst on all Washington State Cougars men's basketball home games during the 2019–20 season.

NBA career statistics

Regular season

|-
| style="text-align:left;"|
| style="text-align:left;"|Houston
| 7 || 0 || 9.0 || .407 ||  || 1.000 || 1.3 || .9 || .4 || .0 || 3.3
|-
| style="text-align:left;"|
| style="text-align:left;"|Houston
| 45 || 0 || 4.2 || .493 || .000 || .633 || .6 || .6 || .2 || .1 || 1.9
|-
| style="text-align:left;"|
| style="text-align:left;"|Houston
| 36 || 0 || 5.5 || .429 || .333 || .793 || 1.3 || .8 || .3 || .1 || 2.7
|-
| style="text-align:left;"|
| style="text-align:left;"|Cavaliers
| 44 || 15 || 20.2 || .414 || .172 || .707 || 3.7 || 2.1 || .9 || .7 || 6.2
|-
| style="text-align:left;"|
| style="text-align:left;"|Cavaliers
| 79 || 27 || 21.6 || .466 || .344 || .674 || 3.2 || 2.6 || 1.0 || .4 || 7.1
|-
| style="text-align:left;"|
| style="text-align:left;"|Cavaliers
| 82 || 4 || 22.8 || .475 || .390 || .607 || 3.6 || 3.2 || 1.3 || .2 || 7.4
|-
| style="text-align:left;"|
| style="text-align:left;"|Cavaliers
| 81 || 64 || 35.7 || .464 || .419 || .681 || 5.4 || 4.6 || 1.6 || .3 || 13.6
|-
| style="text-align:left;"|
| style="text-align:left;"|Cavaliers
| 82 || 68 || 33.7 || .445 || .329 || .679 || 4.7 || 4.6 || 1.5 || .4 || 10.1
|-
| style="text-align:left;"|
| style="text-align:left;"|Cavaliers
| 63 || 62 || 32.0 || .453 || .413 || .707 || 4.9 || 3.8 || 1.2 || .3 || 12.3
|-
| style="text-align:left;"|
| style="text-align:left;"|Cavaliers
| 82 || 73 || 31.2 || .490 || .381 || .717 || 4.9 || 3.1 || 1.3 || .3 || 11.6
|-
| style="text-align:left;"|
| style="text-align:left;"|Atlanta
| 82 || 0 || 26.2 || .446 || .348 || .727 || 3.4 || 3.3 || 1.7 || .3 || 10.0
|-
| style="text-align:left;"|
| style="text-align:left;"|Atlanta
| 49 || 0 || 23.8 || .453 || .381 || .620 || 3.0 || 2.3 || .9 || .1 || 9.7
|-
| style="text-align:left;"|
| style="text-align:left;"|Atlanta
| 79 || 8 || 22.3 || .428 || .371 || .786 || 3.2 || 1.7 || 1.1 || .1 || 8.5
|-
| style="text-align:left;"|
| style="text-align:left;"|Seattle
| 62 || 0 || 13.7 || .351 || .284 || .500 || 1.8 || 1.1 || .6 || .1 || 3.5
|-class="sortbottom"
| style="text-align:center;" colspan="2"|Career
| 873 || 321 || 24.1 || .453 || .369 || .689 || 3.6 || 2.8 || 1.1 || .3 || 8.6

Playoffs

|-
| style="text-align:left;"|1985
| style="text-align:left;"|Houston
| 3 || 0 || 2.0 || 1.000 ||  || 1.000 || 5.0 || .5 || .3 || .5 || 1.3
|-
| style="text-align:left;"|1986
| style="text-align:left;"|Houston
| 10 || 0 || 3.8 || .500 || .000 || .800 || .3 || .6 || .4 || .1 || 2.0
|-
| style="text-align:left;"|1988
| style="text-align:left;"|Cavaliers
| 5 || 1 || 25.6 || .425 || .000 || .625 || 3.6 || 3.4 || 1.0 || .0 || 8.8
|-
| style="text-align:left;"|1989
| style="text-align:left;"|Cavaliers
| 4 || 1 || 24.8 || .436 || .385 || .818 || 1.5 || 3.3 || .8 || .3 || 12.0
|-
| style="text-align:left;"|1990
| style="text-align:left;"|Cavaliers
| 5 || 5 || 39.2 || .419 || .333 || .632 || 6.4 || 6.4 || 1.2 || .0 || 13.8
|-
| style="text-align:left;"|1992
| style="text-align:left;"|Cavaliers
| 17 || 14 || 32.5 || .414 || .412 || .762 || 4.5 || 4.5 || 1.2 || .3 || 9.6
|-
| style="text-align:left;"|1993
| style="text-align:left;"|Cavaliers
| 9 || 9 || 32.1 || .418 || .385 || .800 || 3.4 || 2.8 || 1.3 || .4 || 10.9
|-
| style="text-align:left;"|1994
| style="text-align:left;"|Atlanta
| 11 || 0 || 28.8 || .424 || .348 || .708 || 2.7 || 3.6 || 1.0 || .0 || 11.4
|-
| style="text-align:left;"|1995
| style="text-align:left;"|Atlanta
| 3 || 0 || 16.3 || .167 || .167 || 1.000 || 2.3 || 1.0 || .7 || .0 || 3.0
|-
| style="text-align:left;"|1996
| style="text-align:left;"|Atlanta
| 9 || 0 || 19.0 || .293 || .304 || .714 || 2.0 || 1.0 || 1.0 || .2 || 4.0
|- class="sortbottom"
| style="text-align:center;" colspan="2"|Career
| 76 || 30 || 24.3 || .409 || .343 || .734 || 2.9 || 2.9 || 1.0 || .2 || 8.1

References

External links

Craig Ehlo biography on NBA.com

1961 births
Living people
American men's basketball players
Atlanta Hawks players
Basketball players from Texas
Cleveland Cavaliers players
Houston Rockets draft picks
Houston Rockets players
Mississippi Jets players
Odessa Wranglers men's basketball players
Seattle SuperSonics players
Shooting guards
Small forwards
Sportspeople from Lubbock, Texas
Washington State Cougars men's basketball players